Bly may refer to:

Places
In the United States
Bly, Missouri, a ghost town
Bly, Oregon, a small town in Oregon

Other
Bly (surname)
Bly, the fictional setting of The Turn of the Screw

See also
Bligh (disambiguation)